Thomas Maule Guthrie (1870 – 30 March 1943) was a Scottish Liberal Party politician.

He was educated at Craigmount School, Edinburgh. He was elected as a Coalition Liberal Member of Parliament (MP) for Moray and Nairn at an unopposed by-election on 21 June 1922. He was re-elected at the 1922 general election as a National Liberal, narrowly beating a Liberal Party opponent.

Guthrie lost his seat at the 1923 general election to the Unionist Party candidate James Gray Stuart. At the 1929 general election he contested Dunbartonshire.

References

Notes

External links 
 

1870 births
1943 deaths
Members of the Parliament of the United Kingdom for Scottish constituencies
Scottish Liberal Party MPs
UK MPs 1922–1923
Politics of Moray
People educated at Craigmount School
UK MPs 1918–1922
National Liberal Party (UK, 1922) politicians